René Auguste Émile Boutegourd was a French Brigadier General of World War I. He commanded the 51st Reserve Division throughout the war, notably leading the Division at the First Battle of the Marne.

Family
His father, Jean-Baptiste Boutegourd was a native of Landunvez, had a brilliant career in the Imperial French Navy, a master gunner for line crews, military medalist, and a knight of the Legion of Honor. His grandfather was a recipient of the Saint Helena Medal. His mother was Françoise Bernicot who was a native at Lambézellec with her parents coming from Landéda and Bourg-Blanc. René would be an only child as his three brothers and sister died in infancy.

Early military career

Inspired by family tradition, René chose a military career, but unlike his father, he would enter the French Army. He enlisted at the age of 18 in Brest in the 2nd Marine Infantry Regiment, which in 1901 became the 2nd Colonial Infantry Regiment. Boutegourd was promoted to corporal on April 3, 1877, with enough ambition to study at the École spéciale militaire de Saint-Cyr the same year, from which he graduated as second lieutenant on October 10, 1879. He was promoted to lieutenant in 1882.

Cochinchina Campaigns
At the beginning of the 1880s, Cochinchina was a French possession where the indigenous population retained a certain autonomy. During these years, France sought to consolidate its positions more deeply towards the interior of the country which would form the future French Indochina which caused the French to enlist Marine Regiments to expand more inland. It was therefore with the 2nd Marine Infantry Regiment that he distinguished himself in the Far East between 1881 and 1886, notably by leading a column in Cambodia. In 1883, he was a lieutenant in the regiment of Tirailleurs indochinois.

He was then promoted to Captain on April 18, 1885, but he was wounded in action on December 14, 1885. During the years 1886–1887, he was still in Cochinchina with the 2nd Marine Infantry Regiment. In 1890, he was transferred to Senegal to the general staff, attached to the 3rd Marine Infantry Regiment. He was made a Knight of the Legion of Honor on December 20, 1886, and an Officer of the Royal Order of Cambodia on July 25, 1887, with the latter personally awarded by King Norodom of Cambodia. Boutegourd also received the Tonkin Expedition commemorative medal during this period.

African Colonial Campaigns
He then served in Dahomey during the First Franco-Dahomean War as a member of the French chief of staff. At the end of the 19th century, the great European powers participated in the Scramble for Africa. The armies meet the resistance of the indigenous populations with the French colonial infantry engaging in these confrotations. From 1890 to 1891 he was sent and transferred to Algeria with the 3rd Marine Infantry Regiment.

By 1891, he was at the headquarters of the colonial forces at Senegal and in 1892, he was promoted to Chef de Bataillon. In 1904, he was promoted to colonel in the 1st Foreign Regiment in Casablanca. By March 20, 1914, he was promoted general inspector of the 1st Military Region.

World War I
After the outbreak of World War I, on August 2, 1914, Boutegourd was given command of the 51st Infantry Division. On September 7, 1914, seven soldiers of the 327th Infantry Regiment were condemned for having abandoned their post. By the order of Brigadier General René Boutegourd, without carrying out a real investigation, the following were ordered to be executed: Barbieux, Clément (deceased on September 9 "from his wounds"), Caffiaux, Désiré Hubert (rehabilitated twelve years later and listed on the war memorial of the town of Trith-Saint-Léger, Nord), Delsarte, Dufour and Waterlot. The latter emerged unscathed from the shooting and died on the forehead onJune 10, 1915. The so-called “327th arrondissement  ” case was the subject of a major rehabilitation campaign by the League for Human Rights, but it was unsuccessful.

In 1919, he was assigned to the 9th Military Region at Tours. He died on April 3, 1932, at Brest.

Awards
Legion of Honor
Knight (December 20, 1886)
Officer (April 19, 1906)
Commander (July 11, 1914)
Grand Officer (July 6, 1919)
Royal Order of Cambodia, Officer (July 25, 1887)
Order of the Black Star, Commander

References

Bibliography
.

1858 births
1932 deaths
French military personnel of World War I
People from Finistère
French generals
Grand Officiers of the Légion d'honneur
Commandeurs of the Légion d'honneur
Officiers of the Légion d'honneur
Chevaliers of the Légion d'honneur